Moses "Daddy Moses" Wilkinson or "Old Moses" (c. 1746/47 – ?) was an American Wesleyan Methodist preacher and Black Loyalist. His ministry combined Old Testament divination with African religious traditions such as conjuring and sorcery. He gained freedom from slavery in Virginia during the American Revolutionary War, was a Wesleyan Methodist preacher in New York and Nova Scotia. In 1791, he migrated to Sierra Leone, preaching alongside ministers Boston King and Henry Beverhout. There, he established the first Methodist church in Settler Town and survived a rebellion in 1800.

Early life
Circa 1746, Moses Wilkinson was born enslaved on a plantation in Nansemond County, Virginia. He was enslaved by Miles Wilkinson. 

Wilkinson was blind and mobility impaired, possibly due to surviving smallpox. He was unable to walk without assistance.

Self-liberation 
The 1775 Dunmore's Proclamation promised slaves of American rebels their freedom if they would join the British forces fighting in the American Revolutionary War. The following year, Wilkinson led a band of slaves to freedom, also freeing himself. He reached New York City, which the British forces occupied for years during the war.

Ministry

New York 
In New York, the self-appointed, illiterate Wesleyan Methodist preacher gathered together a congregation. He was "a very fiery preacher, so much that some who watched him feared for his health."

Nova Scotia 
When the British were defeated in 1783, they fulfilled their promise of freedom to thousands of former slaves, evacuating them to other colonies, and England. Wilkinson joined some 3,000 other Black Loyalists in on L'Abondance to Halifax in Nova Scotia; he is listed with them in the Book of Negroes. The largest Black Loyalist settlement in Nova Scotia was established in Birchtown, but the refugees found the climate and conditions harsh, and the Crown was slow to grant them land.

In the spring of 1784, Shelburne was visited by William Black, the province’s future Methodist leader. Shelburne reported preaching to 200 Blacks at Birchtown, sixty of whom were converted by Wilkinson. His first convert was Violet "Peggy" King, a self-liberated freedwoman from North Carolina, whom he had met on L'Abondance; she was married to Boston King. 

In July 1786, Wilkinson and others organized a Methodist church with seventy-eight members, sixty-six of whom were black.

Sierra Leone 
On 26 October 1791, 350 people gathered in Wilkinson's church to hear John Clarkson from England explain the Sierra Leone Company's plans to reestablish a colony in West Africa, in what is now Sierra Leone. The previous attempt in 1787 had failed and he was recruiting Black Loyalists who wanted to try creating their own settlement in Africa. Displeased with the cold climate and discrimination from the resident whites, who included Loyalist slaveholders, Wilkinson, members of his Methodist congregation, and many blacks of other congregations emigrated; some 1196 Nova Scotian Settlers set sail from Halifax on 15 January 1792.

The ships made landfall on March 9 1792. Wilkinson established the first Methodist church in Settler Town. The officers of the Sierra Leone Company clashed with members of the independent-minded Christian denominations, and matters came to a head with a failed rebellion led by Methodists in 1800. Two Methodists were executed; a number of others, mostly Methodist, were exiled elsewhere in West Africa. Wilkinson's brand of Methodism lost favour in the colony.

Legacy 
His ministry inspired Gowan Pamphlet, minister and freedman who founded the Black Baptist Church in Williamsburg, Virginia.

As detailed above, Wilkinson's preaching led to the creation of the Black Methodist community of Halifax.

See more 

 List of Black Loyalists

References

Further reading
  Cassandra Pybus, Epic Journeys of Freedom: Runaway Slaves of the American Revolution and Their Global Quest for Liberty. Beacon Press, 2007
 Vincent Carretta (ed.), Unchained Voices: An Anthology of Black Authors in the English-Speaking World of the 18th Century, University Press of Kentucky, 1996, 2004
 James W. St. G. Walker,  The Black Loyalists: The Search for a Promised Land in Nova Scotia and Sierra Leone 1783-1870, 1992
 Simon Schama, Rough Crossings: Britain, the Slaves and the American Revolution, HarperCollins, 2006
 Lamin Sanneh, Abolitionists Abroad: American Blacks and the Making of Modern West Africa, Harvard University Press, 2001
 The Wesleyans. (Accessed February 2014)
 Susan Ware, Forgotten Heroes: Inspiring American Portraits From Our Leading Historians, The Free Press, 1998
 Robin W. Winks, The Blacks in Canada: A History

African-American Methodist clergy
American rebel slaves
Nova Scotian Settlers
People from Suffolk, Virginia
1740s births
Date of death missing
Fugitive American slaves
American expatriates in Sierra Leone
Canadian expatriates in Sierra Leone
Loyalists in the American Revolution from Virginia
Black Nova Scotians